The following is a list of public and private colleges and universities in New York City.

Public institutions

City University of New York (CUNY)

Community colleges 

 Borough of Manhattan Community College
 Bronx Community College
 Guttman Community College
Hostos Community College
Kingsborough Community College
LaGuardia Community College
Queensborough Community College

4-Year colleges 
Hunter College
Baruch College
Brooklyn College
City College of New York
College of Staten Island
John Jay College of Criminal Justice
Lehman College
Medgar Evers College
New York City College of Technology
Queens College
York College

Honors college 

CUNY William E. Macaulay Honors College

Graduate colleges 

 CUNY Graduate Center
CUNY Graduate School of Journalism
CUNY School of Law
CUNY School of Medicine
CUNY School of Professional Studies
CUNY School of Public Health

State University of New York 

Fashion Institute of Technology
SUNY College of Optometry
SUNY Downstate Medical Center
SUNY Empire State College (The Harry Van Arsdale Jr. Center for Labor Studies)
SUNY Maritime College

Private institutions 

Albert Einstein College of Medicine
Alliance University (formerly Nyack College)
American Academy of Dramatic Arts
 American Academy McAllister Institute
American Musical and Dramatic Academy
ASA College
Bank Street College of Education
Bard College Graduate Center
Barnard College
Berkeley College
Boricua College
Brooklyn Law School
Christie's Education
College of Mount Saint Vincent
Columbia University
Teachers College
Union Theological Seminary
Cooper Union
Cornell University
Cornell NYC Tech
Weill Cornell Graduate School of Medical Sciences
Weill Cornell Medical College
DeVry University
Keller Graduate School of Management
Fordham University
Frank G. Zarb School of Business at Hofstra University
General Theological Seminary
Gerstner Sloan Kettering Graduate School of Biomedical Science
Hebrew Union College
Helene Fuld College of Nursing
Icahn School of Medicine at Mount Sinai
Jewish Theological Seminary of America
 The Juilliard School
The King's College
Laboratory Institute of Merchandising
 Long Island Business Institute - Flushing
Long Island University
 Mandl College of Allied Health
Manhattan College
Manhattan School of Music
Marymount Manhattan College
Mercy College
Metropolitan College of New York
Monroe College
The New School
Eugene Lang College The New School for Liberal Arts
The New School College of Performing Arts
The Schools of Public Engagement at The New School
The New School for Social Research
Parsons School of Design
New York Academy of Art
New York Conservatory for Dramatic Arts
New York Film Academy
 New York Graduate School of Psychoanalysis
New York Institute of Technology
New York Law School
 New York School of Interior Design
New York Theological Seminary
New York University
Gallatin School of Individualized Study
New York University Polytechnic School of Engineering
New York University School of Law
New York University Stern School of Business
New York University School of Medicine
Tisch School of Arts
Pace University
Pacific College of Oriental Medicine
Phillips Beth Israel School of Nursing
Plaza College
Pratt Institute
Rabbi Isaac Elchanon Theological Seminary
Richard Gilder Graduate School - American Museum of Natural History
Rockefeller University
School of American Ballet
School of Visual Arts
St. Francis College
St. John's University
New Brunswick Theological Seminary
St. Joseph's University
Sotheby's Institute of Art
 Swedish Institute of Massage Therapy
Touro University
Vaughn College of Aeronautics & Technology
Wagner College
Yeshiva University
Benjamin N. Cardozo School of Law

References

 

New York City
New York City education-related lists